Liane Alexandra Curtis (born July 11, 1965) is an American film and television actress and musician, known for her appearances in B movies as Critters 2: The Main Course and Girlfriend from Hell, as well as smaller roles in films such as Sixteen Candles.

Early life 
Liane Alexandra Curtis was born in New York City.  She attended the Rudolf Steiner School in New York City. Curtis' parents, Jack Curtis (1926–1970) and Paulette Rubinstein (maiden; born 1923) did many voices for the U.S. dubs of Japanese sci-fi films and TV series. Jack and Paulette married December 31, 1964. Jack was a voice actor for characters that included Pops Racer and Inspector Detector for the Japanese anime series Speed Racer in 1967 as well as a director and producer of The Flesh Eaters in 1964. Paulette was an actress as well as screenwriter and songwriter and has performed with Eddie Albert in The Seven Year Itch (early 1950s) and with Julie Andrews in The Boy Friend (1954). Paulette was also known as Paulette Girard. From about 1951 about 1956, she was married to jazz accordionist Mat Mathews (1924–2009).

Curtis's paternal grandmother, Mabel Curtis (née Ford; 1888–1982), the third wife (of three) of her paternal grandfather, Jack Curtis (né Jacob Zinn; born 1880), was a popular tap dancer in a quartet of four sisters known then as The Four Fords. Curtis's father's first wife, Anna Chandler (1879–1957), was a widely known vaudeville actress and mezzo-soprano. Curtis's cousin, Roy Benson (January 17, 1914 – December 6, 1977) was a stage magician born in Courbevoie in France. Just like the rest of the family Benson was also an accomplished musician. He is credited for Special Effects, having created the monster for the film The Flesh Eaters (1964) directed by Liane's father, Jack Curtis. Benson was very respected among his peers.

Career
Curtis' feature film debut was Baby It's You directed by John Sayles.

Curtis founded Vulcan A Productions in 2005, located in Los Angeles, to produce and distribute feature films, reality and scripted television. She also co-owned the production company oy-oy-click-click.com (inactive as of 2010) with Kathy Messick which they formed in 2004 in Santa Monica, California. In 2006, she formed Mackenzie Group Entertainment, Inc., with her husband, Timothy J Mackenzie, a now suspended California corporation.  The company had worked with USO San Diego as Special Event producers and also manage a few artists.

Personal life
Curtis is married to Timothy J. Mackenzie on March 21, 1999. They have three children. The youngest, Jacqueline MacKenzie (born 1999), whom she had with Mackenzie, is a vocal artist who appeared as a contestant on American Idols Season 14.

TV and filmography
 Baby It's You (1983) as Jody, High School Girl
 Sixteen Candles (1984) as Randy
 The Brother from Another Planet (1984) as Ace
 Hard Choices (1985) (uncredited) as Maureen
 The Best Times (1985) TV series as Annette Dimetriano
 The Equalizer as Elaine (1 episode, 1987)
 Married... with Children as Debbie (1 episode, 1987)
 21 Jump Street as Lauren Carlson (1 episode, 1987)
 Knots Landing as Young Karen (1 episode, 1987)
 Kenny (1988) .... Sharon Kay
 The Bronx Zoo as Joanie Barris (1 episode, 1988)
 Critters 2: The Main Course (1988) as Megan Morgan
 Girlfriend from Hell (1989) as Maggie
 Kojak: None So Blind (1990) (TV) as Lorraine
 WIOU as Trudy (10 episodes, 1990–1991)
 Queens Logic (1991) as Cashier
 Reason for Living: The Jill Ireland Story (1991) (TV) as Lori
 Rock 'n' Roll High School Forever (1991) as Stella
 Wild Orchid II: Two Shades of Blue (1991) as Mona
 Exclusive (1992) (TV) as Carol
 Benny & Joon (1993) as Claudia
 Erotique (1994) as Murohy (segment "Let's Talk About Love")
 Trial by Fire (1995) (TV) as Doreen
 Soundman (1998)  as Kate
 ER as Mrs. Shayotovich, Fossen's Neighbor (2 episodes, 2001)
 The Failures (2003) as Samantha Kyle
 Threat Matrix as Counter Waitress (1 episode, 2003)
 Line of Fire as Hooker 2 (1 episode, 2003)
 Have Love, Will Travel (2007) as Beverly
 Sons of Anarchy as April (1 episode, 2008)
 Angel Falls in Love as Aunt CoCo (2011)

References

External links
 
 

1965 births
American film actresses
American television actresses
Living people
21st-century American women